Ana Belac (born 28 January 1997) is a Slovenian professional golfer. She won both the 2020 Symetra Tour Rookie of the Year and Symetra Tour Player of the Year and was the first Slovenian to join the LPGA Tour.

Amateur career
Belac was the top-ranked female junior golfer in Slovenia and won the Leone di San Marco in 2013 and 2015. She represented Slovenia in the European Ladies' Team Championship on five occasions and in the Espirito Santo Trophy in 2012 and 2014. She competed in the European Young Masters from 2010–13, where she placed second in 2012.

She finished 17th in the 2014 Youth Olympic Games in Nanjing, China and at the 2018 Mediterranean Games she won bronze medal with Vida Obersnel and Pia Babnik in the women's team event.

Belac played college golf at Duke University where she was a two-time All-ACC selection and earned co-medalist honors at 2017 Landfall Tradition and 2019 East Lake Cup. She was a member of victorious International Team at the 2019 Arnold Palmer Cup and led the Blue Devils to the 2019 NCAA Championship team title, winning her matches 3–0. She was named a 2020 WGCA First Team All-American.

Professional career
Belac turned pro in the spring of 2020 when her senior season at Duke was cut short by the coronavirus pandemic. She won the Symetra Tour's Carolina Golf Classic and secured victory in the Volvik Race For the Card to earn a LPGA Tour card for the 2021 season.

Amateur wins
2013 Leone di San Marco
2015 Leone di San Marco
2017 The Landfall Tradition
2019 East Lake Cup

Source:

Professional wins (1)

Symetra Tour wins (1)

Team appearances
Amateur
European Young Masters (representing Slovenia):  2010, 2011, 2012, 2013
Espirito Santo Trophy (representing Slovenia): 2012, 2014, 2016
European Ladies' Team Championship (representing Slovenia): 2011, 2013, 2014, 2015, 2016
Arnold Palmer Cup (representing the International team): 2019 (winners)

Source:

References

External links

Ana Belac on the Duke Blue Devils official site

Slovenian female golfers
Duke Blue Devils women's golfers
LPGA Tour golfers
Mediterranean Games bronze medalists for Slovenia
Mediterranean Games medalists in golf
Competitors at the 2018 Mediterranean Games
Sportspeople from Kranj
1997 births
Living people
20th-century Slovenian women
21st-century Slovenian women